Asian Highway 7 (AH7) is a route in the Asian Highway Network. It runs from Yekaterinburg, Russia to Karachi, Pakistan. It passes from Russia, Kazakhstan, Kyrgyzstan, Uzbekistan, Tajikistan, Afghanistan and Pakistan.

The AH7 shares its route between Merke (Kazakhstan) and Kara-Balta (Kyrgyzstan) about a hundred kilometers along with the AH5. In Kabul (Afghanistan) AH7 stops, but reaches to the city of Kandahar though AH1, where the AH7 resumes its route towards Pakistan.

According to the manual of the Asian Highway Project in 2002 almost the entire route is paved. Only a distance of 72 km in Kyrgyzstan and a piece of 83 kilometers in Tajikistan are unpaved. As of 2017, the entire route in Kyrgyzstan is paved.

In Pakistan AH7 (N25 - Pakistan Road Networks) enters at Chaman. It passes through Qila Abdullah, Quetta, Mastung, Kalat, Khuzdar, Uthal, Goth Hussain and Hub, ending at Karachi. In Pakistan N25 is also called RCD (Regional Cooperation for Development) Highway. Maintained by National Highway Athuroty

Associated Routes

Russia
: Yekaterinburg - Chelyabinsk
: Chelyabinsk - Troitsk - border with Kazakhstan

Kazakhstan
: Karaek - Kostanai - Nur-Sultan - Karaganda - Burubaytal
: Burubaytal - Shu
: Shu - Merke
 : Merke - Chaldovar

Kyrgyzstan
  ЭМ-03 Road: Chaldovar - Kara-Balta
  ЭМ-04 Road: Kara-Balta - Osh
  ЭМ-15 Road: Osh - Border of Uzbekistan

Uzbekistan
  Border with Kyrgyzstan - Andijon - Angren - Ohangaron 
 : Ohangaron  - Tashkent 
 : Tashkent - Chinoz - Sirdaryo
 : Sirdaryo - Xovos

Tajikistan
  РБ15 Road: Khavast - Zarafshon - Istaravshan 
  РБ01 Road : Istaravshan - Dushanbe 
  РБ09 Road : Dushanbe - Qizilqala - Bokhtar - Panji Poyon

Afghanistan
Shirkhan - Pol-e Khomri - Jabal Saraj - Kabul
Kabul–Kandahar Highway: Kabul - Kandahar
Kandahar - Spin Boldak

Pakistan
  Chaman — Quetta — Kalat — Karachi

See also
 List of Asian Highways
 International E-road network
 Trans-African Highway network

References

External links
 Treaty on Asian Highways with routes

Asian Highway Network
Roads in Russia
Roads in Kazakhstan
Roads in Uzbekistan
Roads in Kyrgyzstan
Roads in Afghanistan
Roads in Tajikistan
Roads in Pakistan